Ahmed Sékou Touré International Airport , also known as Gbessia International Airport, is an airport serving Conakry, capital of the Republic of Guinea in West Africa.  It parallels the south shore of the Kaloum Peninsula approximately five kilometers from its tip.  Autoroute Fidel Castro connects the airport to Conakry proper.

The Conakry VOR/DME (Ident: GIA) and Conakry non-directional beacon (Ident: CY) are located on the field.

History
The airport was built in 1945.

In the 1970s, Soviet Naval Aviation was granted facilities at the airport to serve as a staging base for Atlantic maritime reconnaissance patrols by Tu-95RTs aircraft.

It was reported in 1975 that most of the Guinean air force's aircraft were based at Conakry-Gbessia Airport. Current air force operations are conducted out of the Conakry-Gbessia Airport.

All non-ECOWAS foreigners are required to have a valid Guinean visa and a vaccination card in order to be granted entry. Yellow fever vaccination cards are verified upon entry into the country at Gbessia.

As of 2010, the airport possesses no radar and guides all planes in by sight. Night flights by European airlines require pilots to do a fly over of the runway following a near miss of a landing Air France A330 from Paris and a departing Air Senegal International Boeing 737-700 to Dakar.

In 2009, with a goal to increase annual passenger capacity to 1 million passengers, renovations began on the main terminal. Renovation costs amounted to 60 billion GNF (Around 85 million EUR). The government debated in 2007 whether to relocate the Conakry Airport to Forecariah, although no official changes have been declared, as of 2011. Traditionally, passengers embarked on all flights directly on the tarmac with transfers to the airport either by foot (most inter West African flights) or by buses for all European flights. The new renovations included gateways and an improved passenger departure lounge. As of January 2011, no changes have been made to the arrivals (customs and luggage carousels). The airport, as of 2012, has 360,000+ passengers per year.

On December 13, 2022, the Guinean State becomes 100% owner of SOGEAC, by acquiring 49% of the shares held by Aéroports De Paris (ADP), the French Development Agency (AFD) and the Chamber of Commerce and Industry of Bordeaux (CCIB) within the Conakry Airport Management and Exploitation Company (SOGEAC).

Airlines and destinations

Notes
: Emirates' flight to Dubai–International from Conakry makes an initial stop in Dakar, but the flight Dubai–International to Conakry is nonstop. Emirates does not have fifth freedom rights on the Dakar to Conakry sector.

Statistics

Incidents and Accidents

 On 3 September 1978, an Air Guinee Ilyushin Il-18 from Moscow to Conakry crashed into marshland near Conakry. 15 of the total 17 occupants were killed. One crewmember and one passenger survived. The aircraft was destroyed.

 On 1 July 1983, a Chosonminhang (predecessor to Air Koryo) Ilyushin Il-62M on a non-scheduled international passenger flight from Pyongyang Sunan International Airport to Conakry via Kabul and Cairo crashed at the Fouta Djallon Mountains in Guinea. All 17 passengers and 6 crew on board were killed, and the aircraft was written off.

 On 19 November 2000, a Ghana Airways McDonnell Douglas DC-9 from Kotoka International Airport (in Accra) via Abidjan, Monrovia and Freetown with 42 passengers and 8 crew performed a gear-up landing in Conakry. The plane was written off.

 In 2007, a Guinean Air Force MiG-21 departing from Conakry crashed into the Radio Télévision Guinéenne headquarters. The Russian pilot ejected and was unharmed.

 On 28 July 2010, a Mauritania Airways Boeing 737 leased from Tunisair operating from Dakar to Conakry with 91 passengers and 6 crew overran the end of the runway in heavy rain. There were no fatalities, but the aircraft was damaged beyond repair.

 On 2 September 2022, engine 2 of TAP Air Portugal Flight 1492, an Airbus A320-251N, struck a motorcycle that crossed runway 24 during the plane's landing roll. Both riders on the motorcycle perished; however, no one on board the plane was injured. Engine 2 of the plane was damaged from the collision.

See also
Transport in Guinea
List of airports in Guinea

References

External links
OpenStreetMap - Conakry
Google Maps - Conakry Airport

Conakry Airport Website

Airports in Guinea
Buildings and structures in Conakry
Airports established in 1945
1945 establishments in French West Africa